Turnertown is an unincorporated community in Rusk County, located in the U.S. state of Texas. According to the Handbook of Texas, the community had a population of 76 in 2000. It is located within the Longview, Texas metropolitan area.

History
Turnertown developed from another community further east when it moved here after the roads were built. The East Texas Oil Field caused it to become a boomtown in 1930. Horace and Boger Turner, Sr., were given land grants to plat it. Its population was 1,500 with 25 businesses in 1936. It plummeted to 350 in the early 1940s, and up to the 1950s, it had three churches and a wide array of stores, oilfield supply houses, and machine shops. The population further declined to 150 in the mid-1960s, and by the end of that decade, it further declined to 76, where it remained through 2000. Turnertown has received mail from Selman City since the late 1960s or early 1970s. 

On April 26, 1991, an F2 tornado struck Turnertown, uprooting several trees.

Geography

Education
Today, the community is served by the West Rusk County Consolidated Independent School District.

Notes

Unincorporated communities in Cherokee County, Texas
Unincorporated communities in Texas